"Valentino" is a song by British synthpop band Years & Years and British singer MNEK. The song was written by Olly Alexander and MNEK, who served as the track's producer. Accompanied by a music video, "Valentino" was released on 15 February 2019 by Polydor Records, and was featured on the re-release version of Years & Years' second studio album, Palo Santo (2018). The music video was filmed in Stockholm, Sweden, and was directed by Jordan Rossi.

References

2019 singles
2019 songs
Years & Years songs
MNEK songs
Music videos shot in Stockholm
Polydor Records singles
Songs written by MNEK
Songs written by Olly Alexander